Rhodoscypha is a fungal genus in the family Pyronemataceae (class Pezizomycetes). It is a monotypic genus, containing the single species Rhodoscypha ovilla, originally described in 1876 by Charles Horton Peck as a species of Peziza.

References

Pezizales genera
Pyronemataceae
Taxa named by Henry Dissing